The 2012–13 St. Francis Brooklyn Terriers women's basketball team represented St. Francis College during the 2012–13 NCAA Division I women's basketball season.  The Terrier's home games were played at the Generoso Pope Athletic Complex. The team has been a member of the Northeast Conference since 1988. St. Francis Brooklyn was coached by John  Thurston, who was in his first year at the helm of the Terriers.

Roster

Schedule

|-
!colspan=9 style="background:#0038A8; border: 2px solid #CE1126;;color:#FFFFFF;"| Non-Conference Regular Season

|-
!colspan=9 style="background:#0038A8; border: 2px solid #CE1126;;color:#FFFFFF;"| Northeast Conference Regular Season

|-
!colspan=9 style="background:#0038A8; border: 2px solid #CE1126;;color:#FFFFFF;"| Northeast Conference tournament

See also
2012–13 St. Francis Brooklyn Terriers men's basketball team

References

St. Francis Brooklyn
St. Francis Brooklyn Terriers women's basketball seasons
St. Francis Brooklyn Terriers women's basketball
St. Francis Brooklyn Terriers women's basketball